ZRS may refer to these organisations:
 Union of the Workers of Slovakia, a political party
 Republike Srpske Railways, a rail operator in Bosnia and Herzegovina
 Association of Radio Amateurs of Slovenia, a non-profit

See also 
ZR (disambiguation)